Matthew S. LoPresti is an American politician who served as a member of the Hawaii House of Representatives for District 41 (Ewa, Ewa Beach, Ewa Gentry, Ewa Villages, Hoakalei, Ocean Pointe). He previously served from January 2015 to January 2019. He was a candidate for state Senate 19th district in 2018.

In January 2021, LoPresti helped found the bicameral Progressive Legislative Caucus and served as its chair.

He was defeated in the 2022 elections by Republican David A. Alcos, III.

Education
LoPresti earned a Bachelor of Arts in philosophy, Bachelor of Arts in history, and Master of Arts in philosophy from the University of Toledo, followed by a PhD in philosophy from the University of Hawai‘i at Mānoa.

Career
LoPresti is an Associate Professor of Philosophy and Humanities at Hawai‘i Pacific University. He has taught in various capacities at the University of Hawai‘i at Mānoa, Chaminade University, Kapiolani Community College, West Virginia University, University of Toledo, and Antioch College's Buddhist Studies Program in London, England and Bodhgaya, India. In 2020, he was invited to Jinan, China to present a speech to the Chinese Academy of Social Sciences entitled "Nurturing an Ecological Economy: a role for traditional Hawaiian and Chinese values."

In 2022, LoPresti served as Chair of the House Committee on Veterans, Military, & International Affairs, & Culture and the Arts. He was also a and member of the O'ahu Metropolitan Planning Organization.

LoPresti was arrestedfor driving under the influence on June 17, 2022 by troopers near Ewa Beach on the Hawaiian Island of O'ahu. The charges were dismissed later that year. 

During the 2018 elections, LoPresti gained notice for a video recording depicting his tampering with an opponent's campaign flyer, for which he later apologized. He previously denied taking down an opponent's political signs in the 2016 elections.

LoPresti was elected to consecutive two-year terms on the executive committee of the Sierra Club's Oahu Group, where he served as Vice Chair. He was also elected to a two-year term on the ‘Ewa Neighborhood Board in 2011.

References

Living people
Democratic Party members of the Hawaii House of Representatives
Place of birth missing (living people)
Year of birth missing (living people)
University of Hawaiʻi at Mānoa alumni
University of Hawaiʻi faculty
University of Toledo alumni
Chaminade University of Honolulu faculty
21st-century American politicians